Julian Franklin Keith Nott (born 23 August 1960) is a British composer and conductor, mostly of animated films. He is known for his work on Wallace and Gromit and Peppa Pig.

Biography 
Nott was born in Marylebone, London, the son of Miloska Nott and John Nott; his sister is Sasha Swire. He was educated at Eton College and Lady Margaret Hall, Oxford, where he studied Music and Philosophy, Politics and Economics and was the college organ scholar. After a few years working for Arthur Andersen Management Consultants in the City (now Accenture) and writing freelance for The Economist Group,  he enrolled at the British National Film and Television School. There, he met the creator of the Wallace and Gromit series, Nick Park. They both received recognition for the work they did there, including Park's student film A Grand Day Out.

After leaving the National Film and Television School, Nott worked for some years as a documentary film-maker, making films for Channel 4 and other broadcasters until he gradually switched to a career in television and film composing.

His credits include many dramas for BBC such as the popular Lark Rise to Candleford and ITV's The Vice.

Nott has also directed and written one feature film of his own, a 2001 comedy entitled Weak at Denise.

In 2006, he won an Annie Award for his score on Wallace & Gromit: The Curse of the Were-Rabbit and an Ivor Novello Award in 2009 for the Wallace and Gromit film A Matter of Loaf and Death. As a producer, he received a BAFTA nomination for the short film "Chicken" in 1990.

Nott is a director of the Performing Right Society and the Mechanical Copyright Protection Society.

He is the son of Sir John Nott, the British Secretary of State for Defence during the Falklands War.

Selected filmography

Film

TV

References

External links 
 

1960 births
Living people
British people of Slovenian descent
British people of Jewish descent
Equinox (TV series)
People from Marylebone
People educated at Summer Fields School
People educated at Eton College
Aardman Animations people
Alumni of Lady Margaret Hall, Oxford
Alumni of the National Film and Television School
Musicians from London
English film score composers
English male film score composers
Animation composers
Annie Award winners
Julian